Eva Maria Düringer Cavalli (born Eva Maria Düringer, and sometimes referred to as Eva Cavalli) is an Austrian fashion designer and former beauty pageant contestant. She held the title of Miss Austria in 1977 and the title of Miss Europe in 1978/1977. She was also previously the co-creative director for Cavalli brands. Cavalli and her husband divorced in 2010.

Biography 
She was born at Lake Constance, Bodensee, Austria. Her parents are Frieda Koenig and Anton Düringer. At 17 years old, she won the title of Miss Austria. She was the youngest participant to hold the crown. She attended the Miss Universe pageant in 1977, where she was placed first runner-up, placing first runner up makes the highest placement in her country's Miss Universe, and the Miss World pageant in 1977, where she reached the semi-finals. She also attended the Miss Europe 1977 pageant and was crowned as the winner. In 1980, she married a jury member of Miss Universe, Italian leather designer Roberto Cavalli. The couple had three children together and their main residence was in Florence until their divorce in 2010.

Cavalli worked with her husband on the fashion collections of the Cavalli brands.

References 

Austrian beauty pageant winners
Austrian fashion designers
Year of birth missing (living people)
Living people
Austrian women fashion designers
Miss Universe 1977 contestants
Miss World 1977 delegates
Miss Europe winners